Lac d'Apremont (or Lac de Retenue de Barrage d'Apremont) is a reservoir in Vendée, France. The reservoir is formed by a gravity dam at Apremont, built in 1966: barrage d'Apremont.

External links
Etat des lieux du SAGE du bassin de la Vie et du Jaunay , August 2005

Apremont
Landforms of Vendée
Apremont